Symphyllophyton is a genus of flowering plants belonging to the family Gentianaceae.

Its native range is Brazil.

Species:

Symphyllophyton campos-portoi 
Symphyllophyton caprifolioides

References

Gentianaceae
Gentianaceae genera